Maniram (Vidhan Sabha constituency) was one of the 425 Vidhan Sabha (Legislative Assembly) constituencies of Uttar Pradesh state in central India.  It was a part of the Gorakhpur district and one of the assembly constituencies in the Gorakhpur (Lok Sabha constituency). Maniram Assembly constituency came into existence in 1962 and ceased to exist in 2008 as a result of "Delimitation of Parliamentary and Assembly Constituencies Order, 2008".

Members of Vidhan Sabha
 1957: Keshav Pandey, Indian National Congress
 1962: Mahant Avaidyanath, Hindu Mahasabha
 1967: Mahant Avaidyanath, Independent
 1969: Mahant Avaidyanath, Hindu Mahasabha (elected to Lok Sabha in 1970 bye-poll)
 1972 bye-poll : R K Dwivedi (Congress) 
 1974: Mahant Avaidyanath, Hindu Mahasabha
 1977: Mahant Avaidyanath, Janata Party  
 1980: Hari Dwar Pandey, Indian National Congress (I)
 1985: Bhrigu Nath Bhatt, Indian National Congress
 1989: Om Prakash, Hindu Mahasabha
 1991: Om Prakash, Bharatiya Janata Party
 1993: Om Prakash, Bharatiya Janata Party
 1996: Chandresh Paswan, Samajwadi Party
 1996: Subhawati Devi, Samajwadi Party
 2002: Kamlesh Paswan, Samajwadi Party
 2007: Vijay Bahadur Yadav, Bharatiya Janata Party
 2008 onwards : The constituency ceased to exist.

See also

 Gorakhpur
 Gorakhpur (Lok Sabha constituency)
 Maniram
 Uttar Pradesh

References

Politics of Gorakhpur district
Former assembly constituencies of Uttar Pradesh